The second series of British reality television music competition All Together Now started airing on BBC One on 2 March 2019. It is presented by Rob Beckett and heading up the 100 Geri Halliwell (credited as Geri Horner). Shellyann Evans was crowned the winner of the second series on 13 April 2019.

Performances

Heat 1 (2 March)

Southern Flavor advanced to the final.

Heat 2 (9 March)

Xavier advanced to the final.

Heat 3 (23 March)

Ben advanced to the final.

Heat 4 (30 March)

Shellyann advanced to the final.

Heat 5 (6 April)

Anastasia advanced to the final.

The Final (13 April)

Sing-Off details

The 100
The 100 are a range of music experts and performers from across the UK. As well as previous series', some new judges were added to the panel, including:

 Frankie Cena, Mister World Talent 2012 and an R&B singer.
 Talia Mar, a video content creator and singer.
 Ami Carmine, a singer, songwriter and DJ.
 Ben Papworth, a musical director working in the West End of London.
 Celestina Diamond, a backing singer who's performed with singers like Mariah Carey and Madonna.
 Carreira 3, an R&B group formed by three brothers who have toured with Ne-Yo and Tinie Tempah.
 Rebecca Louise Porter, an Adele tribute act.
 Gatham Cheema, a singer from Worcester who competed in The X Factor of 2012 and 2013.
 Rachelle Rhienne, a singer and songwriter from Balloch.
 Lily-Rose Sheppard, a professional "mermaid singer".
 Julie Miles, a vocal coach who has worked with Sam Lavery and Courtney Hadwin among others.
 Yvette Royle, a function singer and Celine Dion tribute act.
 Reena Kaur, a punjabi folk singer.
 Dayton Grey, a Motown & Soul singer from Dudley.
 Michael Auger, a member of the musical theatre band Collabro.
 Bud and Aidan, twin brothers and singers of the punk band We Are One from Doncaster.
 Jack Griffin, an entertainment manager.

Ratings

References

External links
 

All Together Now (franchise)
2019 British television seasons